Children of the Future may refer to:
Analog's Children of the Future, 1982 science fiction anthology
 Children of the Future (album), an album by the Steve Miller Band